Hugh James (and its sister company Hugh James Involegal) is a British law firm. It is the largest Welsh-headquartered law firm.

In 2018 Hugh James moved to a new office at Central Square, which in 2019 was named the best corporate workplace in England and Wales (south).

History 
Hugh James was founded in 1960 by Hugh James, a Welsh litigation specialist.

It has a reputation for medical negligence claim work, particularly in the field of defective medical devices and implants. It formed its sister division, Involegal, in 2010, which focusses on volume legal service for corporate clients including banks and insurers.

Hugh James acted on a range of transactions as part of the regeneration of Cardiff Bay in 1987. The site was developed as a mixed use site of housing, retail, leisure, and industry, acting for Nippon Electric Gas among other investor clients. The firm's work was praised at the time for its handling of the complex issues of toxic material contamination linked to the site's former use as an industrial dockland, finishing the legal work on the project in four months.

The firm was also involved in property deals at the now-rejected Circuit of Wales at Ebbw Vale, the International Conference Centre in Newport, and the on-hold Swansea tidal lagoon project, deals valued at up to more than £1.2bn.

Hugh James is closely involved in the political issues of Welsh law, for example contributing to debate on the Renting Homes (Wales) Act 2016, as well as the debate over devolution of legal powers from the current national jurisdiction shared by England and Wales.

Involegal 
Hugh James Involegal is the specialist volume services division of the firm, which serves as a subsidiary of the firm. It accounts for 200 of the firm's 700 staff, including a particular reliance on software developers, business analysts, and project managers.

It was a major player in the 1990s growth of the volume legal services sector, and today acts for major banks, insurers, and investors on scale projects that involve volume conveyancing and customer service provision.

Offices 

Hugh James has two offices.

Cardiff 
Hugh James, Two Central Square, Cardiff CF10 1FS

Hugh James is headquartered in the Welsh capital Cardiff, at its new build office at Two Central Square. It moved to the premises in October 2018, and shares the building with the Cardiff School of Journalism, Media and Cultural Studies. There are approximately 152 lawyers and thirty partners based at the Cardiff office.

City of London 
Hugh James, 99 Gresham Street, London EC2V 7NG

Following a series of mergers with London-based firms, Hugh James moved to a new office on Gresham Street in the City of London in February 2018. Based at the office are approximately thirty lawyers and six partners.

Recognition 

The table below sets out Hugh James' and its lawyers’ rankings in directories:

Leadership 

The table below sets out a history of Hugh James' leadership:

References

External links 
 

Law firms of the United Kingdom
Business organisations based in the United Kingdom
Business organisations based in Wales
Law firms based in Cardiff
Law firms of Wales
Law firms established in 1960
Welsh law
1960 establishments in Wales